MRIA may refer to:

Sciences, Humanities and Social Sciences
 Member of the Royal Irish Academy, a title awarded as public recognition of academic excellence.

Transportation
 Mattala Rajapaksa International Airport, an international airport serving the city of Hambantota in southeast Sri Lanka.

Finance
Matter(s) Requiring Immediate Attention, a type of regulatory finding issued by members of the FFIEC